John O'Reilly may refer to:

 John O'Reilly (soldier) (born 1908), Irish soldier
 John O'Reilly (politician) (born 1951), Canadian politician
 John O'Reilly (composer) (born 1940), composer and music theorist
 John O'Reilly (cricketer) (born 1930), Australian cricketer
 John B. O'Reilly Jr. (born 1948), mayor of Dearborn, Michigan
 John Boyle O'Reilly (1844–1890), poet and novelist
 John Francis O'Reilly (1888–1942), Australian politician
 John Joseph O'Reilly (1888–1933), Australian politician
 John O'Reilly (engineer) (born 1946), vice-chancellor of Cranfield University
 John Joe O'Reilly (politician) (1881–1967), Irish politician
 John Joe O'Reilly (Gaelic footballer) (1919–1952)

See also
 Jack O'Reilly (1914–?), footballer
 Jack O'Reilly (Gaelic footballer) (1896–1942), Irish Gaelic footballer
 John O'Reily (1846–1915), Australian bishop
 John Reilly (disambiguation)